Wilton North railway station is a former railway station serving Wilton, Wiltshire, England. The station was opened in 1856 by the Great Western Railway on its Salisbury branch from Westbury. It was closed to passengers in 1955 and completely in 1965.

History 
Opened with the line on 30 June 1856, the station had at first just one platform, on the left of trains towards Westbury. A second platform was added when the line was doubled in 1896. Along with other local stations it was closed on 19 September 1955, but remained open for goods traffic until 6 September 1965. The goods shed remains intact and is used as a shop.

A short distance to the south, the Salisbury and Yeovil Railway opened a station called Wilton in 1859, on the route that became the West of England line of the London and South Western Railway. In September 1949 the former LSWR station was renamed , and the former GWR station became "Wilton North".

Possible reopening
In 2015, the TransWilts Community Rail Partnership proposed a new Wilton Parkway station immediately to the east, on the other side of Kingsway road bridge. A two-platform, six-carriage-length station would serve the adjacent Park and Ride, as well as the Fugglestone Red housing estate which was being built on the former and adjacent Erskine Barracks site. Besides providing a link to Salisbury and access to London services, there could be services to other parts of Wiltshire on the TransWilts route.

, Wiltshire Council continues to support the proposal (sometimes called Wilton Junction), but no government funding has been forthcoming. Wilton was not among the projects selected for feasibility studies by the Department for Transport under the 2020–2021 "Restoring your railway" initiative.

References

 

Disused railway stations in Wiltshire
Former Great Western Railway stations
Railway stations in Great Britain opened in 1856
Railway stations in Great Britain closed in 1955
1856 establishments in England
1955 disestablishments in England
Wilton, Wiltshire